Wyllyotts Manor is a public house and restaurant in Potters Bar, England, and a grade II listed building with Historic England. It consists of a late 16th-century barn, possibly built for Robert Taylor between 1594 and 1603, and a house that dates from around 1800.

References

External links

Grade II listed pubs in Hertfordshire
Potters Bar
Timber framed buildings in Hertfordshire